"Frogs Eat Butterflies. Snakes Eat Frogs. Hogs Eat Snakes. Men Eat Hogs" is a poem from Wallace Stevens's first book of poetry,  Harmonium. It was first published in The Dial in 1922 and is therefore in the public domain.

Interpretation
This poem's title is one of those that rankled with Louis Untermeyer, but Stevens insisted on it in preference to the abbreviated "Frogs Eat Butterflies", which he wrote in a 1922 letter, "would have an affected appearance, which I should dislike". If "The Worms at Heaven's Gate" is about death, then "Frogs Eat Butterflies. Snakes Eat Frogs. Hogs Eat Snakes. Men Eat Hogs." is about aging.

Notes

References 

 Stevens, H. Letters of Wallace Stevens. 1996: University of California Press.

1922 poems
American poems
Poetry by Wallace Stevens